Qiang is a Chinese name, primarily used as a given name:

Notable people with the name include:

Given name 
 Chi Qiang, Chinese competitive sailor
 Qiang Du, Chinese mathematician and computational scientist 
 Gao Qiang, Chinese politician
 Huang Qiang, Chinese-Malaysian diver
 Jin Qiang, Chinese footballer
 Li Qiang (disambiguation), multiple people
 Liu Qiang, Chinese boxer
 Qin Qiang (athlete), Chinese track and field athlete
 Shen Qiang, Canadian table tennis player of Chinese origin
 Song Qiang, Chinese essayist
 Wang Qiang (disambiguation), multiple people
 Wen Qiang, Chinese judicial official
 Xiao Qiang, Chinese journalist
 Qiang Yang, Chinese scientist
 Ye Qiang, Chinese handball player
 Zhou Qiang, President of the Supreme People's Court of China

Surname 
Qiang Wei, Chinese politician

See also 
 Jiang (surname) (彊/强), a Chinese surname for which Qiang is an alternate transliteration

Chinese given names